The LNB Pro A Best Scorer, or Top Scorer, is the best scorer of the season award, of the top-tier level men's professional club basketball league in France, the LNB Pro A. In basketball, points are the sum of the score accumulated through free throws or field goals. The LNB Pro A's scoring title is awarded to the player with the highest points per game average in a given regular season. Prior to the 1976–77 season, the league's Top Scorer was the player that scored the most total points in the league during the season. Since the 1976–77 season, the league's Top Scorer is the player with the highest scoring average per game during the season.

Best scorers by total points scored (1949–50 to 1975–76)

Best scorers by points per game (1976–77 to present)

French Basketball Championship all-time scoring leaders
The all-time leaders in total points scored of the French Basketball Championship, including all of the league's formats.

References

External links
LNB Pro A Official Site 
Palmarès du championnat de France de basket 
Bilans et stats par saison 

European basketball awards
LNB Pro A awards